The cephalonian method is a method of active learning for library orientation first made popular in the United Kingdom at Cardiff University.  Introduced to a wider audience in 2004 by Linda Davies and Nigel Morgan, the method consists of giving the students at a library orientation class cards with prepared questions they are to ask during the session for the instructor to answer. Questions are grouped into categories and colour coded to provide some structure; the order of the questions in any section is based on the order the students choose to stand up, which makes the sessions more random and reduces the repetitive nature of library induction / orientation. However, it may be more appropriate for first year students than more senior students.

The name is taken from a method used for orientation of tourists at a popular resort in Cephalonia, Greece.

References

 
 Davies, Linda; Morgan, Nigel, Innovative library induction ‐ introducing the 'Cephalonian Method' 
 
 Morgan, Nigel, Introducing... The Cephalonian Method
 

Education in Wales
Learning theory (education)
Library science